Balmorhea is a city in Reeves County, in the U.S. state of Texas. The population was 479 in the U.S. Census of 2010.

History
Balmorhea was platted in 1906. Its founders were Ernest D. Balcom, H. R. Morrow, and John and Joe Rhea; the town's name is an amalgamation of their surnames.

Geography

Balmorhea is located at  (30.983894, –103.742292).

Just outside the town, Balmorhea Lake provides irrigation water for the local communities.

Demographics

2020 census

As of the 2020 United States census, there were 408 people, 173 households, and 138 families residing in the city.

2000 census
As of the census of 2000, there were 527 people, 179 households, and 139 families residing in the city. The population density was 1,359.6 people per square mile (521.7/km2). There were 242 housing units at an average density of 624.3 per square mile (239.6/km2). The racial makeup of the city was 58.82% White, 29.41% from other races, and 11.76% from two or more races. Hispanic or Latino of any race were 87.10% of the population.

There were 179 households, out of which 45.8% had children under the age of 18 living with them, 59.8% were married couples living together, 14.5% had a female householder with no husband present, and 22.3% were non-families. 21.8% of all households were made up of individuals, and 10.1% had someone living alone who was 65 years of age or older. The average household size was 2.94 and the average family size was 3.50.

In the city, the population was spread out, with 36.4% under the age of 18, 8.2% from 18 to 24, 25.6% from 25 to 44, 18.2% from 45 to 64, and 11.6% who were 65 years of age or older. The median age was 29 years. For every 100 females, there were 97.4 males. For every 100 females age 18 and over, there were 86.1 males.

The median income for a household in the city was $16,071, and the median income for a family was $20,179. Males had a median income of $19,271 versus $13,958 for females. The per capita income for the city was $7,742. About 32.4% of families and 36.3% of the population were below the poverty line, including 42.0% of those under age 18 and 21.3% of those age 65 or over.

Education
The City of Balmorhea is served by the Balmorhea Independent School District. The superintendent is John Massey , and the principal is Gary Laramore. Balmorhea has captured 1 state championship in 2021

Post Office
Balmorhea Post Office 115 North Fort Worth Street, Balmorhea, Texas 79718-9998

Climate
According to the Köppen Climate Classification system, Balmorhea has a semi-arid climate, abbreviated "BSh" on climate maps.

References

Cities in Texas
Cities in Reeves County, Texas